Targalla subocellata is a moth in the family Euteliidae first described by Francis Walker in 1863. It is found in Taiwan, the north-eastern part of the Himalayas, Sundaland, the Philippines, Sulawesi, the southern Moluccas, New Guinea and Queensland.

Adults have brown wings with a pale marginal half and a dark basal half to each forewing. The hindwings are brown with a series of vague submarginal bands and dark veins.

Subspecies
Targalla subocellata subocellata
Targalla subocellata pantarcha (Turner, 1922) (Australia, New Guinea, the southern Moluccas and Sulawesi)

References

Moths described in 1863
Euteliinae